The 2008 Australian GT Championship was a CAMS sanctioned Australian motor racing competition for closed, production based sports cars which were either approved by the FIA for GT3 competition or approved by CAMS as Australian GT cars. It was the 12th Australian GT Championship to be awarded by CAMS. The Australian GT Sportscar Group Pty Ltd was recognised by CAMS as the Category Manager and Administrator for the 2008 championship.

The championship was won by Mark Eddy driving a Lamborghini Gallardo.

Teams and drivers
The following drivers competed in the 2008 Australian GT Championship.

Race calendar
The championship was contested over a six-round series.

Points system
Championship points were awarded on a 38-32-28-25-23-21-19-18-17-16-15-14-13-12-11-10-9-8-7-6-5-4-3-2-1 to the first 25 finishers in each race. Each driver's worst round point score had to be dropped from his/her overall point score.

Drivers competing with a foreign licence and a Foreign Participation Visa under FIA ISC Regulation 18 Para 5 (e.g. Hector Lester) were not allowed to score championship points.

Championship results

GT Championship

GT Challenge
The GT Challenge class was won by Richard Kimber driving a Porsche 996 GT3 Clubsport.

GT Production
The GT Production class was won by Tim Poulton driving a Lotus Exige S.

Australian Tourist Trophy
The Confederation of Australian Motorsport awarded the 2008 Australian Tourist Trophy to the winners of the 2008 Sandown GT Classic, which was the sixth and final round of the 2008 Australian GT Championship. The title, which was the nineteenth Australian Tourist Trophy, was won by Allan Simonsen and Nick O'Halloren, driving a Ferrari F430 GT3.

References

External links
 2008 Race Results Archive at www.natsoft.biz
 2008 Australian GT Information from feedmesportscars.com As archived at www.webcitation.org

Australian GT Championship
GT Championship